Kaj Birksted (2  March 1915 – 21 January 1996) was a Danish flying ace during World War II where he served in the RAF, with final rank of Wing Commander and Lieutenant Colonel in the Royal Norwegian Air Force.

Early life
Kaj Birksted was born in Copenhagen, Denmark. Shortly after his birth, his family moved to the United States. The family returned to Denmark 12 years later, where in 1928 Birksted  went to Birkerød Boarding school. In 1936, he was admitted to Naval Flying School and was nominated two years later to fly in the reserve. On 22 December 1937, he was appointed Flyverløjtnant-II (Flight 2nd Lieutenant) and later promoted to Flyverløjtnant-I (Flight 1st Lieutenant) in January 1940. On 9 April 1940, when the German forces invaded Denmark, he was serving with the Naval Air Station, Slipshavn.

World War II
On the night of 16–17 April 1940, Birksted and fellow officer Charles Sundby escaped by boat from Denmark to Sweden, and hence to the United Kingdom. From October 1940, he trained in Canada at Little Norway, the Norwegian flight school where he worked as a student/instructor. On 1 November 1940, Birksted was accepted in the Norwegian Air Force, with the rank of Fenrik (Second Lieutenant), being promoted to Løytnant (Lieutenant) on 1 December 1940.

Returning to the UK in March 1941, Birksted attended 56 OTU in mid May 1941, flying the Hawker Hurricane Mk. I. He was then transferred to No. 43 Squadron in late June 1941 until 26 July 1941. In July 1941 he was then posted to the Norwegian-manned No. 331 Squadron as a Flight Commander, then based in Catterick. In April 1942, the Squadron moved to North Weald, converting to the Supermarine Spitfire Mk. V. On 19 June 1942 Birksted made his first combat claims: a Focke-Wulf Fw 190 shot down and  one damaged. He was promoted to Kaptein (Flight lieutenant) on 24 July 1942, and on 19 August participated in the air operations supporting Operation Jubilee at Dieppe.

He then commanded No. 331 Squadron from September 1942 to April 1943. On 14 October 1942, Birksted was decorated with the Distinguished Flying Cross.

On 1 August 1943, Birksted became Wing Commander, RAF, and soon after the equivalent Oberstløytnant, Norwegian Air Force and appointed as Wing Leader, No. 132 (Norwegian) Wing, flying the Spitfire Mk. IX. On 26 November 1943, he received the Distinguished Service Order.

Birksted became tour-expired in March 1944, and was attached to No. 11 Group Staff in Uxbridge as an Operational Planner. On 16 March 1945, he was appointed Wing Commander Flying at RAF Bentwaters, flying the North American P-51 Mustang.

During the war Birksted claimed a total of ten and one shared aircraft confirmed destroyed with five damaged.

After the war
He returned to Denmark after the war, rejoining the newly formed Royal Danish Air Force as a senior staff officer.  Birksted was in the Royal Danish Air Force until 1960 with the rank of colonel, after which he took up a position at NATO.

References

Other sources
 Shores,  Christopher F. & Clive Williams (1966) Aces High: The Fighter Aces of the British and Commonwealth Air Forces in World War II  (Shores & Williams)
Ancker, Paul E. (2006) De danske militære flyverstyrkers udvikling 1910-1940 (Syddansk Universitetsforlag)

External links
Kaj Birksted's Wingco Spitfires
Kaj Birksted bust, near the Frihedsmuseum in Copenhagen
Kaj Birksted in memoriam

1915 births
1996 deaths
20th-century Danish naval officers
People from Copenhagen
Danish emigrants to the United States
Danish World War II flying aces
Norwegian Army Air Service personnel of World War II
Royal Air Force pilots of World War II
Royal Air Force officers
Danish military officers
Recipients of the War Cross with Sword (Norway)
Companions of the Distinguished Service Order
Recipients of the Distinguished Flying Cross (United Kingdom)